Compsophis laphystius is a species of snake in the subfamily Pseudoxyrhophiinae of the family Pseudoxyrhophiidae. The species is endemic to Madagascar.

Habitat
The preferred natural habitat of C. laphystius is the riparian zone of humid forest.

Diet
C. laphystius preys upon frogs.

Reproduction
C. laphystius is oviparous.

References

Further reading
Cadle JE (1996). "Systematics of Snakes of the Genus Geodipsas (Colubridae) from Madagascar, with Descriptions of New Species and Observations on Natural History". Bulletin of the Museum of Comparative Zoology at Harvard College 155 (2): 33–87. (Geodipsas laphystia, new species, pp. 35–44, Figures 1, 3).
Glaw F, Vences M (2006). A Field Guide to the Amphibians and Reptiles of Madagascar, Third Edition. Cologne, Germany: Vences & Glaw Verlag. 496 pp. .

Pseudoxyrhophiidae
Snakes of Africa
Reptiles of Madagascar
Endemic fauna of Madagascar
Reptiles described in 1996